The canton of Bischwiller is an administrative division of the Bas-Rhin department, northeastern France. Its borders were modified at the French canton reorganisation which came into effect in March 2015. Its seat is in Bischwiller.

It consists of the following communes:

Bischwiller
Dalhunden
Drusenheim
Forstfeld
Fort-Louis
Herrlisheim
Kaltenhouse
Kauffenheim
Leutenheim
Neuhaeusel
Oberhoffen-sur-Moder
Offendorf
Rœschwoog
Rohrwiller
Roppenheim
Rountzenheim-Auenheim
Schirrhein
Schirrhoffen
Sessenheim
Soufflenheim
Stattmatten

References

Cantons of Bas-Rhin